Magnuszowiczki  is a village in the administrative district of Gmina Niemodlin in Opole County, Opole Voivodeship in southwestern Poland.

The village's history dates back to medieval Poland. Before 1945 it was part of Germany. During World War II, from 1940 to 1944, a Nazi German forced labour camp for Jews, and initially also Poles, was located there. There is a memorial at the site.

References

External links 
 Jewish Community in Magnuszowiczki on Virtual Shtetl

Magnuszowiczki